BCC Lions Football Club (Benue Cement Company Lions Football Club) is a Nigerian football team based in Gboko, Benue State, that competes in the Nigeria Amateur League, and plays its home games at the J. S. Tarka Stadium.

History 
BCC Lions was founded in 1982 by the owner of Benue Cement Company, Aliko Dangote.

BCC Lions was the first team in Northern Nigeria to win the Nigeria Challenge Cup (now known as the Nigeria FA Cup) in 1989. The game was played at Abubakar Tafawa Balewa Stadium, Bauchi and the only goal of the match scored by Aham Nwankwo. The club went on to win the 1993, 1994, 1997 editions of the Challenge Cup as well.

After winning the Challenge Cup the club won the first edition of the Mandela Cup in 1990. During the early 1990s, BCC Lions were one of the dominant teams in the league, peaking with the double in 1994.

They were relegated from the Nigerian Premier League in 1998 by two points, and were unable to regain the former glory. After spending six years in the lower division, they slowly lost their fan base and financial support. Despite a 2.5 million naira boost from Benue State governor George Akume in 2002 and another million from Guilder Brewing two years later, the team was disbanded, not even showing up for their 2004 FA Cup first round game against Shooting Stars F.C. An attempt to resurrect the team began in November 2007. Dangote, also chairman of the BCC board, announced 110 million naira for the team to participate in the 2008/09 season. They were relegated after finishing 13th.

Achievements
Nigerian Premier League: 1
1994

Nigerian FA Cup: 4
1989, 1993, 1994, 1997

African Cup Winners' Cup: 1
1990

Performance in CAF competitions
African Cup of Champions Clubs: 1 appearance
1995 – Second Round

CAF Cup Winners' Cup: 4 appearances
1990 – Champion
1991 – Finalist
1994 – Quarter-Finals
1998 – First Round

References

External links
 GULDER SPLASHES N20.5m ON CLUBS
 The Punch: Benue woos BCC to revive Lions
 BCC Lions to bounce back
 Benue government moves to revive BCC Lions
 BCC Lions coach laments (Tribune)

 
Football clubs in Nigeria
Benue State
Association football clubs established in 1982
1982 establishments in Nigeria
Sports clubs in Nigeria
African Cup Winners Cup winning clubs